Héctor Rodas Ramírez (born 7 March 1988) is a Spanish professional footballer who plays as a central defender for Atlético Saguntino.

Club career
Born in Valencia, Valencian Community, Rodas finished his development at local Levante UD, and made his senior debut with the reserves, spending several years with them in the lower leagues. On 30 May 2009, he appeared in his first official game with the first team, starting in a 1–0 home win over Rayo Vallecano in the Segunda División.

In the 2009–10 season, Rodas played 22 matches for the Granotas, who returned to La Liga after a two-year absence. He made his debut in the top flight on 28 August 2010, featuring the entire 1–4 home loss against Sevilla FC.

After playing only once in the first half of the 2011–12 campaign, a 3–1 defeat at Deportivo de La Coruña in the Copa del Rey in which he was also sent off, Rodas was loaned to neighbouring Elche CF in January 2012. Returned to Levante, he made 21 competitive appearances in 2012–13, including eight in the team's round-of-16 run in the UEFA Europa League.

On 28 January 2015, Rodas terminated his contract with the club, and signed with Real Betis of the second tier two days later. After appearing rarely, he moved to Córdoba CF in the same league on 27 June.

Rodas joined Cercle Brugge K.S.V. of the Belgian First Division B on a two-year contract on 11 July 2017. He returned to his country after only one season, however, going on to represent AD Alcorcón and Cultural y Deportiva Leonesa.

On 11 August 2021, Rodas signed a one-year deal with Indian Super League side Odisha FC. He made his league debut on 24 November against Bengaluru FC in a 3–1 win, scoring a brace the following week in the 6–4 victory over SC East Bengal.

Career statistics

Club

Honours
Betis
Segunda División: 2014–15

Cercle Brugge
Belgian Second Division: 2017–18

References

External links

1988 births
Living people
Spanish footballers
Footballers from Valencia (city)
Association football defenders
La Liga players
Segunda División players
Segunda División B players
Tercera División players
Segunda Federación players
Atlético Levante UD players
Levante UD footballers
Elche CF players
Real Betis players
Córdoba CF players
AD Alcorcón footballers
Cultural Leonesa footballers
Atlético Saguntino players
Challenger Pro League players
Cercle Brugge K.S.V. players
Indian Super League players
Odisha FC players
Spanish expatriate footballers
Expatriate footballers in Belgium
Expatriate footballers in India
Spanish expatriate sportspeople in Belgium
Spanish expatriate sportspeople in India